Saint-Pierre-du-Chemin is a commune in the Vendée department in the Pays de la Loire region in western France.

Personalities
It was the birthplace of Pierre Bersuire (c. 1290-1362).

Geography
The river Lay has its source in the commune.

See also
Communes of the Vendée department

References

Communes of Vendée